Caenurgia chloropha, the vetch looper moth, is a moth of the family Erebidae. The species was first described by Jacob Hübner in 1818. It is found in the south-eastern United States, northern Mexico and Cuba. Strays may be found as far north as southern Ontario.

The wingspan is about 27–36 mm. The forewings are pale grayish brown in males and orange yellow-brown in females. The lines are fine and inconspicuous. The hindwings are yellowish with two gray bands in both sexes. There are two or more generations per year with adults on wing from April to October.

The larvae feed on vetch and other legumes. Full-grown larvae may be found from May onward.

References

Moths described in 1818
Caenurgia
Moths of North America